Hindustani (Devanagari: , ; Perso-Arabic: ,) is an Indo-Aryan language spoken in Northern and Central India and Pakistan, and used as a lingua franca in both countries. Hindustani is a pluricentric language with two standard registers, known as Hindi and Urdu. Thus, it is also called Hindi–Urdu. Colloquial registers of the language fall on a spectrum between these standards.

The concept of a Hindustani language as a "unifying language" or "fusion language" was endorsed by Mahatma Gandhi. The conversion from Hindi to Urdu (or vice versa) is generally achieved just by transliteration between the two scripts, instead of translation which is generally only required for religious and literary texts.

Some scholars trace the language's first written poetry, in the form of Old Hindi, to as early as 769 AD. However this view is not generally accepted. During the period of the Delhi Sultanate, which covered most of today's India, eastern Pakistan, southern Nepal and Bangladesh and which resulted in the contact of Hindu and Muslim cultures, the Sanskrit and Prakrit base of Old Hindi became enriched with loanwords from Persian, evolving into the present form of Hindustani. The Hindustani vernacular became an expression of Indian national unity during the Indian Independence movement, and continues to be spoken as the common language of the people of the northern Indian subcontinent, which is reflected in the Hindustani vocabulary of Bollywood films and songs.

The language's core vocabulary is derived from Prakrit (a descendant of Sanskrit), with substantial loanwords from Persian and Arabic (via Persian).

As of 2020, Hindi and Urdu together constitute the 3rd-most-spoken language in the world after English and Mandarin, with 810 million native and second-language speakers, according to Ethnologue, though this includes millions who self-reported their language as 'Hindi' on the Indian census but speak a number of other Hindi languages than Hindustani. The total number of Hindi–Urdu speakers was reported to be over 300 million in 1995, making Hindustani the third- or fourth-most spoken language in the world.

History

Early forms of present-day Hindustani developed from the Middle Indo-Aryan apabhraṃśa vernaculars of present-day North India in the 7th–13th centuries, chiefly the Dehlavi dialect of the Western Hindi category of Indo-Aryan languages that is known as Old Hindi. Hindustani emerged as a contact language around Delhi, a result of the increasing linguistic diversity that occurred due to Muslim rule, while the use of its southern dialect, Dakhani, was promoted by Muslim rulers in the Deccan. Amir Khusrow, who lived in the thirteenth century during the Delhi Sultanate period in North India, used these forms (which was the lingua franca of the period) in his writings and referred to it as Hindavi. The Delhi Sultanate, which comprised several Turkic and Afghan dynasties that ruled much of the subcontinent from Delhi, was succeeded by the Mughal Empire in 1526.

Ancestors of the language were known as Hindui, Hindavi, Zabān-e Hind, Zabān-e Hindustan, Hindustan ki boli, Rekhta, and Hindi. Its regional dialects became known as Zabān-e Dakhani in southern India, Zabān-e Gujari in Gujarat, and as Zabān-e Dehlavi or Urdu around Delhi. It is an Indo-Aryan language, deriving its base primarily from the Western Hindi dialect of Delhi, also known as Khariboli.

Although the Mughals were of Timurid (Gurkānī) Turco-Mongol descent, they were Persianised, and Persian had gradually become the state language of the Mughal empire after Babur, a continuation since the introduction of Persian by Central Asian Turkic rulers in the Indian Subcontinent, and the patronisation of it by the earlier Turko-Afghan Delhi Sultanate. The basis in general for the introduction of Persian into the subcontinent was set, from its earliest days, by various Persianised Central Asian Turkic and Afghan dynasties.

Hindustani began to take shape as a Persianised vernacular during the Delhi Sultanate (1206–1526 AD) and Mughal Empire (1526–1858 AD) in South Asia. Hindustani retained the grammar and core vocabulary of the local Delhi dialect. However, as an emerging common dialect, Hindustani absorbed large numbers of Persian, Arabic, and Turkic loanwords, and as Mughal conquests grew it spread as a lingua franca across much of northern India; this was a result of the contact of Hindu and Muslim cultures in Hindustan that created a composite Ganga-Jamuni tehzeeb. The language was also known as Rekhta, or 'mixed', which implies that it was mixed with Persian. Written in the Perso-Arabic, Devanagari, and occasionally Kaithi or Gurmukhi scripts, it remained the primary lingua franca of northern India for the next four centuries, although it varied significantly in vocabulary depending on the local language. Alongside Persian, it achieved the status of a literary language in Muslim courts and was also used for literary purposes in various other settings such as Sufi, Nirgun Sant, Krishna Bhakta circles, and Rajput Hindu courts. Its majors centres of development included the Mughal courts of Delhi, Lucknow, Agra and Lahore as well as the Rajput courts of Amber and Jaipur.

In the 18th century, towards the end of the Mughal period, with the fragmentation of the empire and the elite system, a variant of Hindustani, one of the successors of apabhraṃśa vernaculars at Delhi, and nearby cities, came to gradually replace Persian as the lingua franca among the educated elite upper class particularly in northern India, though Persian still retained much of its pre-eminence for a short period. The term Hindustani was given to that language. The Perso-Arabic script form of this language underwent a standardisation process and further Persianisation during this period (18th century) and came to be known as Urdu, a name derived from Persian: Zabān-e Urdū-e Mualla ('language of the court') or Zabān-e Urdū ('language of the camp'). The etymology of the word Urdu is of Chagatai origin, Ordū ('camp'), cognate with English horde, and known in local translation as Lashkari Zabān, which is shorted to Lashkari. This is all due to its origin as the common speech of the Mughal army. As a literary language, Urdu took shape in courtly, elite settings. Along with English, it became the first official language of British India in 1850.

Hindi as a standardised literary register of the Delhi dialect arose in the 19th century; the Braj dialect was the dominant literary language in the Devanagari script up until and through the 19th century. While the first literary works (mostly translations of earlier works) in Sanskritised Hindustani were already written in the early 19th century as part of a literary project that included both Hindu and Muslim writers (e.g. Lallu Lal, Insha Allah Khan), the call for a distinct Sanskritised standard of the Delhi dialect written in Devanagari under the name of Hindi became increasingly politicised in the course of the century and gained pace around 1880 in an effort to displace Urdu's official position.

John Fletcher Hurst in his book published in 1891 mentioned that the Hindustani or camp language of the Mughal Empire's courts at Delhi was not regarded by philologists as a distinct language but only as a dialect of Hindi with admixture of Persian. He continued: "But it has all the magnitude and importance of separate language. It is linguistic result of Muslim rule of eleventh & twelfth centuries and is spoken (except in rural Bengal) by many Hindus in North India and by Musalman population in all parts of India." Next to English it was the official language of British Raj, was commonly written in Arabic or Persian characters, and was spoken by approximately 100,000,000 people. The process of hybridization also led to the formation of words in which the first element of the compound was from Khari Boli and the second from Persian, such as rajmahal ‘palace’ (raja ‘royal, king’ + mahal ‘house, place’) and rangmahal ‘fashion house’ (rang ‘colour, dye’ + mahal ‘house, place’). As Muslim rule expanded, Hindustani speakers traveled to distant parts of India as administrators, soldiers, merchants, and artisans. As it reached new areas, Hindustani further hybridized with local languages. In the Deccan, for instance, Hindustani blended with Telugu and came to be called Dakhani. In Dakhani, aspirated consonants were replaced with their unaspirated counterparts; for instance, dekh ‘see’ became dek, ghula ‘dissolved’ became gula, kuch ‘some’ became kuc, and samajh ‘understand’ became samaj.

When the British colonised the Indian subcontinent from the late 18th through to the late 19th century, they used the words 'Hindustani', 'Hindi', and 'Urdu' interchangeably. They developed it as the language of administration of British India, further preparing it to be the official language of modern India and Pakistan. However, with independence, use of the word 'Hindustani' declined, being largely replaced by 'Hindi' and 'Urdu', or 'Hindi-Urdu' when either of those was too specific. More recently, the word 'Hindustani' has been used for the colloquial language of Bollywood films, which are popular in both India and Pakistan and which cannot be unambiguously identified as either Hindi or Urdu.

Registers

Although, at the spoken level, Hindi and Urdu are considered registers of a single language, Hindustani or Hindi-Urdu, as they share a common grammar and core vocabulary, they differ in literary and formal vocabulary; where literary Hindi draws heavily on Sanskrit and to a lesser extent Prakrit, literary Urdu draws heavily on Persian and Arabic loanwords. The grammar and base vocabulary (most pronouns, verbs, adpositions, etc.) of both Hindi and Urdu, however, are the same and derive from a Prakritic base, and both have Persian/Arabic influence.

The standardised registers Hindi and Urdu are collectively known as Hindi-Urdu. Hindustani is the lingua franca of the north and west of the Indian subcontinent, though it is understood fairly well in other regions also, especially in the urban areas. This has led it to be characterised as a continuum that ranges between Hindi and Urdu. A common vernacular sharing characteristics with Sanskritised Hindi, regional Hindi and Urdu, Hindustani is more commonly used as a vernacular than highly Sanskritised Hindi or highly Persianised Urdu.

This can be seen in the popular culture of Bollywood or, more generally, the vernacular of North Indians and Pakistanis, which generally employs a lexicon common to both Hindi and Urdu speakers. Minor subtleties in region will also affect the 'brand' of Hindustani, sometimes pushing the Hindustani closer to Urdu or to Hindi. One might reasonably assume that the Hindustani spoken in Lucknow, Uttar Pradesh (known for its usage of Urdu) and Varanasi (a holy city for Hindus and thus using highly Sanskritised Hindi) is somewhat different.

Modern Standard Hindi

Standard Hindi, one of the 22 officially recognized languages of India and the official language of the Union, is usually written in the indigenous Devanagari script of India and exhibits less Persian and Arabic influence than Urdu. It has a literature of 500 years, with prose, poetry, religion and philosophy. One could conceive of a wide spectrum of dialects and registers, with the highly Persianised Urdu at one end of the spectrum and a heavily Sanskritised variety spoken in the region around Varanasi, at the other end. In common usage in India, the term Hindi includes all these dialects except those at the Urdu spectrum. Thus, the different meanings of the word Hindi include, among others:
 standardized Hindi as taught in schools throughout India (except some states such as Tamil Nadu),
 formal or official Hindi advocated by Purushottam Das Tandon and as instituted by the post-independence Indian government, heavily influenced by Sanskrit,
 the vernacular dialects of Hindustani as spoken throughout India,
 the neutralized form of Hindustani used in popular television and films (which is nearly identical to colloquial Urdu), or
 the more formal neutralized form of Hindustani used in television and print news reports.

Modern Standard Urdu

Urdu is the national language and state language of Pakistan and one of the 22 officially recognised languages of India. 
It is written, except in some parts of India, in the Nastaliq style of the Urdu alphabet, an extended Perso-Arabic script incorporating Indic phonemes. It is heavily influenced by Persian vocabulary and was historically also known as Rekhta.

As Dakhini (or Deccani) where it also draws words from local languages, it survives and enjoys a rich history in the Deccan and other parts of South India, with the prestige dialect being Hyderabadi Urdu spoken in and around the capital of the Nizams and the Deccan Sultanates.

Earliest forms of the language's literature may be traced back to the 13th-14th century works of Amīr Khusrau Dehlavī, often called the "father of Urdu literature" while Walī Deccani is seen as the progenitor of Urdu poetry.

Bazaar Hindustani
The term bazaar Hindustani, in other words, the 'street talk' or literally 'marketplace Hindustani', has arisen to denote a colloquial register of the language that uses vocabulary common to both Hindi and Urdu while eschewing high-register and specialized Arabic or Sanskrit derived words. It has emerged in various South Asian cities where Hindustani is not the main language, in order to facilitate communication across language barriers. It is characterized by loanwords from local languages.

Names
Amir Khusro  referred to this language of his writings as Dehlavi ( / , 'of Delhi') or Hindavi ( / ). During this period, Hindustani was used by Sufis in promulgating their message across the Indian subcontinent. After the advent of the Mughals in the subcontinent, Hindustani acquired more Persian loanwords. Rekhta ('mixture'), Hindi ('Indian'), Hindustani, Hindvi, Lahori, and Dakni (amongst others) became popular names for the same language until the 18th century. The name Urdu (from Zabān-i-Ordu, or Orda) appeared around 1780. It is believed to have been coined by the poet Mashafi. In local literature and speech, it was also known as the Lashkari Zabān (military language) or Lashkari. Mashafi was the first person to simply modify the name Zabān-i-Ordu to Urdu.

During the British Raj, the term Hindustani was used by British officials. In 1796, John Borthwick Gilchrist published a "A Grammar of the Hindoostanee Language". Upon partition, India and Pakistan established national standards that they called Hindi and Urdu, respectively, and attempted to make distinct, with the result that Hindustani commonly, but mistakenly, came to be seen as a "mixture" of Hindi and Urdu.

Grierson, in his highly influential Linguistic Survey of India, proposed that the names Hindustani, Urdu, and Hindi be separated in use for different varieties of the Hindustani language, rather than as the overlapping synonyms they frequently were:

Literature

Official status

Prior to 1947, Hindustani was officially recognised by the British Raj. In the post-independence period however, the term Hindustani has lost currency and is not given any official recognition by the Indian or Pakistani governments. The language is instead recognised by its standard forms, Hindi and Urdu.

Hindi 
Hindi is declared by Article 343(1), Part 17 of the Indian Constitution as the "official language of the Union." (In this context, "Union" means the Federal Government and not the entire country—India has 23 official languages.) At the same time, however, the definitive text of federal laws is officially the English text and proceedings in the higher appellate courts must be conducted in English.

At the state level, Hindi is one of the official languages in 10 of the 29 Indian states and three Union Territories, respectively: Bihar, Chhattisgarh, Haryana, Himachal Pradesh, Jharkhand, Madhya Pradesh, Rajasthan, Uttarakhand, Uttar Pradesh and West Bengal; Andaman and Nicobar Islands, Dadra and Nagar Haveli, and Delhi.

In the remaining states, Hindi is not an official language. In states like Tamil Nadu and Karnataka, studying Hindi is not compulsory in the state curriculum. However, an option to take the same as second or third language does exist. In many other states, studying Hindi is usually compulsory in the school curriculum as a third language (the first two languages being the state's official language and English), though the intensiveness of Hindi in the curriculum varies.

Urdu 
Urdu is the national language (qaumi zabān) of Pakistan, where it shares official language status with English. Although English is spoken by many, and Punjabi is the native language of the majority of the population, Urdu is the lingua franca. In India, Urdu is one of the languages recognised in the Eighth Schedule to the Constitution of India and is an official language of the Indian states of Bihar, Telangana, Uttar Pradesh, West Bengal, and also the Union Territories of Delhi and Jammu and Kashmir. Although the government school system in most other states emphasises Modern Standard Hindi, at universities in cities such as Lucknow, Aligarh and Hyderabad, Urdu is spoken and learnt, and Saaf or Khaalis Urdu is treated with just as much respect as Shuddha Hindi.

Geographical distribution
Besides being the lingua franca of North India and Pakistan in South Asia, Hindustani is also spoken by many in the South Asian diaspora and their descendants around the world, including North America (e.g., in Canada, Hindustani is one of the fastest growing languages), Europe, and the Middle East.

 A sizeable population in Afghanistan, especially in Kabul, can also speak and understand Hindi-Urdu due to the popularity and influence of Bollywood films and songs in the region, as well as the fact that many Afghan refugees spent time in Pakistan in the 1980s and 1990s.
 Fiji Hindi was derived from the Hindustani linguistic group and is spoken widely by Fijians of Indian origin.
 Hindustani was also one of the languages that was spoken widely during British rule in Burma. Many older citizens of Myanmar, particularly Anglo-Indians and the Anglo-Burmese, still know it, although it has had no official status in the country since military rule began.
 Hindustani is also spoken in the countries of the Gulf Cooperation Council, where migrant workers from various countries live and work for several years.

Phonology

Grammar

Vocabulary

Hindi-Urdu's core vocabulary has an Indic base, being derived from Prakrit, which in turn derives from Sanskrit, as well as a substantial amount of loanwords from Persian and Arabic (via Persian). Hindustani contains around 5,500 words of Persian and Arabic origin.

Hindustani also borrowed Persian prefixes to create new words. Persian affixes became so assimilated that they were used with original Khari Boli words as well.

Writing system

Historically, Hindustani was written in the Kaithi, Devanagari, and Urdu alphabets. Kaithi and Devanagari are two of the Brahmic scripts native to India, whereas the Urdu alphabet is a derivation of the Perso-Arabic script written in Nastaʿlīq, which is the preferred calligraphic style for Urdu.

Today, Hindustani continues to be written in the Urdu alphabet in Pakistan. In India, the Hindi register is officially written in Devanagari, and Urdu in the Urdu alphabet, to the extent that these standards are partly defined by their script.

However, in popular publications in India, Urdu is also written in Devanagari, with slight variations to establish a Devanagari Urdu alphabet alongside the Devanagari Hindi alphabet.

Because of anglicisation in South Asia and the international use of the Latin script, Hindustani is occasionally written in the Latin script. This adaptation is called Roman Urdu or Romanised Hindi, depending upon the register used. Since Urdu and Hindi are mutually intelligible when spoken, Romanised Hindi and Roman Urdu (unlike Devanagari Hindi and Urdu in the Urdu alphabet) are mostly mutually intelligible as well.

Sample text

Colloquial Hindustani
An example of colloquial Hindustani:
Devanagari: 
Urdu: 
Romanisation: 
English: How much is this?

The following is a sample text, Article 1 of the Universal Declaration of Human Rights, in the two official registers of Hindustani, Hindi and Urdu. Because this is a formal legal text, differences in vocabulary are most pronounced.

Literary Hindi

Literary Urdu

Hindustani and Bollywood
The predominant Indian film industry Bollywood, located in Mumbai, Maharashtra uses Modern Standard Hindi, colloquial Hindustani, Bombay Hindi, Urdu, Awadhi, Rajasthani, Bhojpuri, and Braj Bhasha, along with Punjabi and with the liberal use of English or Hinglish in scripts and soundtrack lyrics.

Film titles are often screened in three scripts: Latin, Devanagari and occasionally Perso-Arabic. The use of Urdu or Hindi in films depends on the film's context: historical films set in the Delhi Sultanate or Mughal Empire are almost entirely in Urdu, whereas films based on Hindu mythology or ancient India make heavy use of Hindi with Sanskrit vocabulary.

See also

 Hindustan (Indian subcontinent)
 Languages of India
 Languages of Pakistan
 List of Hindi authors
 List of Urdu writers
 Hindi–Urdu transliteration
 Uddin and Begum Hindustani Romanisation

Notes

References

Bibliography

 Asher, R. E. 1994. "Hindi." Pp. 1547–49 in The Encyclopedia of language and linguistics, edited by R. E. Asher. Oxford: Pergamon Press. .
 Bailey, Thomas G. 1950. Teach yourself Hindustani. London: English Universities Press.
 Chatterji, Suniti K. 1960. Indo-Aryan and Hindi (rev. 2nd ed.). Calcutta: Firma K. L. Mukhopadhyay.
 Dua, Hans R. 1992. "Hindi-Urdu as a pluricentric language." In Pluricentric languages: Differing norms in different nations, edited by M. G. Clyne. Berlin: Mouton de Gruyter. .
 Dua, Hans R. 1994a. "Hindustani." Pp. 1554 in The Encyclopedia of language and linguistics, edited by R. E. Asher. Oxford: Pergamon Press.
 —— 1994b. "Urdu." Pp. 4863–64 in The Encyclopedia of language and linguistics, edited by R. E. Asher. Oxford: Pergamon Press.
 Rai, Amrit. 1984. A house divided: The origin and development of Hindi-Hindustani. Delhi: Oxford University Press.

Further reading 

the University of Michigan
 the University of Michigan
 
 Oxford University
 the New York Public Library
 Oxford University
 Shakespear, John. A Dictionary, Hindustani and English. 3rd ed., much enl. London: Printed for the author by J.L. Cox and Son: Sold by Parbury, Allen, & Co., 1834.
 Taylor, Joseph. A dictionary, Hindoostanee and English. Available at Hathi Trust. (A dictionary, Hindoostanee and English / abridged from the quarto edition of Major Joseph Taylor; as edited by the late W. Hunter; by William Carmichael Smyth.)

External links

 Bolti Dictionary (Hindustani)
 Hamari Boli (Hindustani)
 Khan Academy (Hindi-Urdu): academic lessons taught in Hindi-Urdu
 Hindustani as an anxiety between Hindi–Urdu Commitment
 Hindi? Urdu? Hindustani? Hindi-Urdu?
 Hindi/Urdu-English-Kalasha-Khowar-Nuristani-Pashtu Comparative Word List
 GRN Report for Hindustani
 Hindustani Poetry
 Hindustani online resources
 National Language Authority (Urdu), Pakistan (muqtadera qaumi zaban)

 
Languages attested from the 8th century
Lingua francas
Indo-Aryan languages